Italy competed at the 1995 World Championships in Athletics in Gothenburg, Sweden from 5 to 13 August 1995.

Medalists
The result in the medal table and the number of medals totaled, till to 2017, is the top all-time result at the World Championships for the Italy national athletics team.

Finalists
Italy national athletics team ranked 6th (with 13 finalists) in the IAAF placing table. Rank obtained by assigning eight points in the first place and so on to the eight finalists.

Results
Italy participated with 49 athletes by winning six medals.

Men (30)

Women (19)

References

External links
 The “Azzurri” at the World Championships (from 1983 to 2009)

Nations at the 1995 World Championships in Athletics
World Championships in Athletics
Italy at the World Championships in Athletics